"Divided We Stand" is word play on the motto "united we stand, divided we fall".

Divided We Stand may also refer to:

Film and television
 "Divided We Stand", a season 2 episode of M*A*S*H
 "Divided We Stand", a season 1 episode of Star Trek Continues
 "Divided We Stand", a season 4 episode of Ben 10
 "Divided We Stand", a season 7 episode of McLeod's Daughters
 "Divided We Stand", a season 4 episode of Small Wonder
 "Divided We Stand", a season 7 episode of Steptoe & Son
 "Divided We Stand", a season 2 episode of Monkey Thieves
 "Divided We Stand", a season 2 episode of Shadow Raiders
 "Divided We Stand", a season 1 episode of Space Precinct
 "Divided We Stand", a season 1 episode of World's End

 Divided We Stand, a 1988 television pilot by Aaron Spelling

Literature
 X-Men: Divided We Stand, a 2008 comic book storyline published by Marvel Comics

Music
 Divided We Stand (album), a 2003 album by T.S.O.L. 
 "Divided We Stand", a song on the 2010 album Absolute Power by Pro-Pain
 "Divided We Stand", a song on the 2013 album We All Fall Down by Strange Music
 "Divided We Stand", a song on the 1981 album Unsung Heroes by Dixie Dregs

See also

 
 
 United We Stand (disambiguation)
 Divided We Fall (disambiguation)
 United We Fall (disambiguation)